Beighton Miners Welfare F.C. was an English association football club based in Beighton, Sheffield, South Yorkshire.

History
Starting from the first qualifying round, they reached the first round of the FA Cup in 1953, where they were beaten by Wrexham at Millmoor. During this era they were also members of the Yorkshire League and won the prestigious Sheffield Senior Cup on two occasions.

Honours

League
Yorkshire League Division 1
Runners-up: 1952–53
Yorkshire League Division 2
Promoted: 1949–50
Hatchard League
Champions: 1919–20 (shared), 1920–21

Cup
Sheffield Senior Cup
Winners: 1939–40, 1955–56
Runners-up: 1940–41, 1947–48, 1949–50, 1952–53
Aston-cum-Aughton Charity Cup
Runners-up: 1903–04

Records
Best League performance: Yorkshire League Division 1, 1952–53
Best FA Cup performance: 1st Round, 1952–53

References

Defunct football clubs in South Yorkshire
Defunct football clubs in England
Sheffield Association League
Hatchard League
Yorkshire Football League
Mining association football teams in England